Reto Perl (November 23, 1923 – February 27, 1987) was an ice hockey player for the Swiss national team. He won a silver medal at the 1948 Winter Olympics.

References 

1923 births
1987 deaths
Ice hockey players at the 1948 Winter Olympics
Olympic bronze medalists for Switzerland
Olympic ice hockey players of Switzerland
Olympic medalists in ice hockey
Medalists at the 1948 Winter Olympics